Food Feuds is a weekly series hosted by Iron Chef Michael Symon that premiered on Food Network October 10, 2010. The show features food rivalries or "feuds" between local restaurants in cities around the United States.

Synopsis
In each episode Michael Symon travels from city to city to settle some of the most famous food rivalries/feuds in the country. Symon visits both establishments, see how the specialties are prepared, tries both dishes up for the challenge, then talks with local food critics and fans to help him decide who should win. At the end, a final critique of the specialty is conducted by Symon himself, the only judge. He bases the food on three criteria: appearance, taste, and overall product while both challengers stand by to find out if they will receive the Food Feud trophy and be crowned the champion.

Episodes
Food Feuds premiered on October 10, 2010, with two back-to-back episodes that premiered at 10:00 and 10:30 pm EST. New episodes currently air on Thursday nights at 10:00 pm EST.

Note: The pilot episode debuted on Food Network and aired on Friday, June 4, 2010 at 10:30 pm ET/PT.

Season 1 (2010)

See also
Food Wars on Travel Channel

References

 http://tvtango.com/series/food_feuds/episodes

External links
 www.foodnetwork.com/food-feuds/index.html

Food reality television series
Food Network original programming
2000s American television series
2010 American television series debuts